Houston We Are GO is the first live album by Christian pop rock band Newsboys, released on 30 September 2008. It includes a CD and DVD. It was filmed at the Berry Center in Houston, Texas.

Track listing

Personnel
 Peter Furler – lead vocals, guitars, drums
 Paul Colman – lead guitar, vocals
 Jeff Frankenstein – keyboards, key bass, vocals
 Duncan Phillips – drums, percussion

References 

Newsboys albums
2008 live albums
Inpop Records live albums
2008 video albums
Live video albums
Inpop Records video albums
Christian live video albums